Morakot Sriswasdi is the Thai Ambassador to Austria, Slovenia and Slovakia, and the Permanent Representative to the United Nations and International Organizations in Vienna.

She presented her credentials in Austria on June 14, 2019, and in Slovenia on January 29, 2020.

She earned an undergraduate degree in political science from Chulalongkorn University, a master’s degree in Development Science from the Institute of Social Sciences in The Hague, a master’s degree in Human Resource Management from Mahidol University, and a postgraduate diploma in International Economics from the University of Sussex.

References

Morakot Sriswasdi
Morakot Sriswasdi
Ambassadors to Slovakia
Ambassadors to Slovenia
Living people
Morakot Sriswasdi
Morakot Sriswasdi
Alumni of the University of Sussex
Year of birth missing (living people)